Vezza d'Oglio is a comune in the province of Brescia, in Lombardy, northern Italy. It is located in the upper Camonica Valley.

Origins of the name 
Legend has it that a flood destroyed the ancient town of Rosolina, on the detritus of which the current Vezza was born. Èsa means "barrel", and it was this object that was found in the place of the natural disaster; a barrel full of oil which gave rise to the name. The dialect translation of the name (Éza) means barrel.

Religion

Churches 

San Clemente (1585)

Twin towns 

  Flayosc since 2002

References
2. https://www.comune.vezza-d-oglio.bs.it. Official website. Retrieved 13 June 2022.

Cities and towns in Lombardy